The Deseret Limestone, also known as the Pine Canyon Formation, is a geologic formation in Utah. It preserves marine fossils dating back to the Carboniferous period or Mississippian age. It was formed by the Panthalassa ocean around 340 Ma. Fossils are mostly of tabulate and rugose corals, and other marine invertebrates; vertebrates are represented by conodonts. The Deseret is a 500-foot thick layer of dolomitic limestone with chert, with a basal layer of black shale that is host rock for many Utah caves such as Timpanogos Cave National Monument.

See also

 List of fossiliferous stratigraphic units in Utah
 Paleontology in Utah

References

Carboniferous geology of Utah
Limestone formations of the United States
Carboniferous southern paleotropical deposits